Marcel Freeman (born March 30, 1960) is a former professional tennis player from the United States.

Career
Freeman's career high singles ranking was world No. 46, which he reached in November, 1986. His best Grand Prix result was reaching the semi-finals in 1988 Queensland Open, whilst his best Grand Slam result was reaching the third round of the 1986 US Open. His career win–loss record for Grand Prix and Grand Slam play was 54–87.

During his career he won 1 doubles title, partnering Rodney Harmon. He achieved a career-high doubles ranking of world No. 70 in 1987.

Career finals

Doubles (1 title, 2 runner-ups)

College tennis
Freeman was a four-time All-American at UCLA.

External links
 
 

American male tennis players
People from Port Washington, New York
Tennis people from New York (state)
UCLA Bruins men's tennis players
1960 births
Living people